Sapozhok is the name of several inhabited localities in Russia.

Urban localities
Sapozhok, Ryazan Oblast, a work settlement in Sapozhkovsky District of Ryazan Oblast

Rural localities
Sapozhok, Saratov Oblast, a selo in Rtishchevsky District of Saratov Oblast
Sapozhok, Volgograd Oblast, a khutor in Mirny Selsoviet of Novonikolayevsky District of Volgograd Oblast
Sapozhok, Voronezh Oblast, a khutor in Chistopolyanskoye Rural Settlement of Ramonsky District of Voronezh Oblast